The Commission scolaire de Chomedey-Laval is a historical school district in Laval, Quebec.

References

Historical school districts in Quebec
Education in Laval, Quebec